Mountaineering: The Freedom of the Hills is often considered the standard textbook for mountaineering and climbing in North America. The book was first published in 1960 by The Mountaineers of Seattle, Washington. The book was written by a team of over 40 experts in the field.

The book grew out of the annual climbing course run since 1935 by the Mountaineers, for which the reading material was originally a combination of European works and lecturers' mimeo outlines. These were assembled into the Climber's Notebook and published by the Mountaineers as the hardbound Mountaineers Handbook in 1948.
By 1955 the rapid postwar evolution of climbing techniques and tools had made the Handbook out of date, and the effort was begun to produce Freedom  of the Hills.  Nearly 80 major contributors are credited in the first edition and were organized by a committee of 8 editors.

The first four editions were only available in hardcover.

Editions

Chapter list
In the 9th edition, the book is divided into six parts as follows

 Part One: Outdoor Fundamentals
 Part Two: Climbing Fundamentals
 Part Three: Rock Climbing
 Part Four: Snow, Ice, and Alpine Climbing
 Part Five: Leadership, Safety, and Rescue
 Part Six: The Mountain Environment

There is an appendix, a glossary, and an index.

Chapters

 First Steps
 Clothing and Equipment
 Camping, Food, and Water
 Physical Conditioning
 Navigation
 Wilderness Travel
 Leave No Trace
 Access and Stewardship
 Basic Safety System
 Belaying
 Rappelling
 Alpine Rock Climbing Technique
 Rock Protection
 Leading on Rock
 Aid and Big Wall Climbing
 Snow Travel and Climbing
 Avalanche Safety
 Glacier Travel and Crevasse Rescue
 Alpine Ice Climbing
 Waterfall Ice and Mixed Climbing
 Expedition Climbing
 Leadership
 Safety
 First Aid
 Alpine Rescue
 Mountain Geology
 The Cycle of Snow
 Mountain Weather

Origin of title
The title of the book is a reference to the ancient medieval European tradition of "Freedom of the City", that conferred upon the recipient access to a city. The reference implies that with the knowledge in the book, a certain equivalent freedom of the wild mountains can be attained.

See also
 Ten Essentials
 Alpine Club Guide
 Cascade Alpine Guide

References

External links
 The Mountaineers Books

1960 non-fiction books
Mountaineering books